The Training Table was a regional chain of fast food restaurants in Utah, United States. Founded in 1977, the chain focused on gourmet burgers. The chain had six locations in the Salt Lake City metropolitan area.

History

The Training Table Restaurants was founded in October 1977. The Training Table was family owned and operated by Kent and Stephanie Chard. It was known for its cheese fries and dipping sauce, along with several sandwich and hamburger preparations. It had locations in Layton, Sugar House, Cottonwood, West Valley, South Towne and Riverton. Until the early 2010s, it also had a location on the eastern edge of downtown Salt Lake City. In 2012 the business had a hard money lender and was near bankruptcy. In 2012 Stephanie Chard purchased 50% of The Training Table Restaurants, which was a family business. Stephanie Chard strategically navigated the company through this tumultuous time and became CEO in 2014. During 2015 Stephanie Chard became aware of misconduct between various individuals associated with The Training Table Restaurants. Stephanie Chard worked for one year to resolve the ongoing dispute, but was unable to come to a resolution with the various parties involved. In 2016 a lawsuit was filed on behalf of Training Table and Stephanie Chard which alleged securities fraud and legal malpractice claims associated with the corporation, among other allegations. In 2016, the Landlords, who were also part owners of Training Table and longtime advisors of Training Table, terminated The Training Table Restaurant's leases, and sold the properties to a third party, closing Training Table after 39 years. They announced that they had gone out of business on November 30, 2016, on their Facebook page.

In the Summer of 2022 the brand's website was updated with a cryptic note explaining, "Tasty things coming soon...".  Multiple local news sources reported on the update suggesting a return for the brand after a six year hiatus.  In October 2022 this was subsequently confirmed as the return of the brand via a number of food trucks and online sales of their famous sauces. The brand also intimated the future return of brick and mortar stores in a press release issued at the same time.

Ordering
The chain was unusual among fast food restaurants because of its system for ordering food. Customers sat at tables or booths, as they would in a typical fast casual restaurant. Each table or booth had an in-house telephone associated with it. When customers had decided on what they wanted to order, they would pick up the telephone, which would automatically ring to the order station in the kitchen. A staff member would answer and take the customer's order over the phone. When the order was ready, the kitchen staff would ring back to the phone at the table, which would signal the customers to go to the front so they could pay for and pick up their food.

Layout
Each Training Table location had a similar layout. the kitchen and register was located at the very back of the restaurant, and the eating area was relatively open. The middle of the restaurant housed booths arranged in small pit chambers, and the periphery was divided into two separate elevated areas. One elevated area mainly had a combination of 2- and 4-person tables with chairs, while the other elevated area offered 2-person tables with chairs as well as tables with mixed bench and chair seating.

References

External links

Restaurants in Utah
Buildings and structures in Salt Lake County, Utah
Buildings and structures in Salt Lake City
Restaurants established in 1977
1977 establishments in Utah